Jacaranda decurrens is a medicinal plant native to Cerrado vegetation. In Portuguese the species goes by the common name  Colomba and pará parai mi.

The plant is used for gynecological infections and other conditions.

The species is native to Brazil, Paraguay, and Bolivia.

References

decurrens
Trees of Brazil
Flora of the Cerrado
Medicinal plants of South America